Ronnie Murphy (born 3 September 1962 in Dublin) was an Irish soccer player during the 1980s and 1990s.

An uncompromising defender, he represented Shamrock Rovers, Bohemians, Dundalk and Monaghan United during his career.

While with Rovers he won the Leinster Senior Cup in 1982 and scored in the 1982-83 UEFA Cup . He got sent off in the next round
at FC Universitatea Craiova on 3 November 1982.

He played 4 times in European competition for the Hoops.

A youth international Ronnie made 163 League appearances (6 goals) and 3 European appearances for Bohs after signing for them in 1983. He signed for Dundalk in June 1990 and won a League of Ireland winners medal in his first season at the club. He remained at Oriel Park until the beginning of the 1993/94 season when he signed for Monaghan.

Honours
League of Ireland
 Dundalk F.C. - 1990/91
 Leinster Senior Cup: 2
 Shamrock Rovers - 1982
 Bohemian F.C. - 1985
 Dublin City Cup
 Shamrock Rovers 1983/84

References

Republic of Ireland association footballers
Republic of Ireland youth international footballers
Association football defenders
League of Ireland players
League of Ireland XI players
Shamrock Rovers F.C. players
Bohemian F.C. players
Dundalk F.C. players
Monaghan United F.C. players
Finn Harps F.C. players
Longford Town F.C. players
1962 births
Living people